Mikhail Yevgenyevich Astashov (born 16 October 1988) is a Russian Paralympic track cyclist and road cyclist, as well as a paratriathlete. He is a two-time Paralympic champion.

Biography
Astashov was born 16 October 1988 in the village of Khandagay. When he was a few days old, he was taken away from his parents, after physicians and aid workers urged them to send him to a baby house, wondering, why they need such a child without hands and feet and assuring them, he won't live long anyway. When he was five he was sent to an orphanage. The time which he spent in the orphanage was positive; Astashov learned all the regular tasks, including walking. Beside that, he practiced different kind of sports, the first one being badminton, which he had to abandon due to lack of support in Ulan-Ude. Then he tried swimming and table tennis, collecting success there, before switching to athletics, which he replaced with paratriathlon (swimming, cycling and walking). He stayed in the orphanage until the age of 18, when he started off searching his family which he eventually found; his mother and father, as well as two brothers were proud and happy to see him return to the family.

Astashov enrolled at the East-Siberian Institute for Culture. Apart from being a successful cyclist, he is a junior national champion in badminton, multitude national champion and record holder in swimming and athletics, a 2016 World Paratriathlon silver medalist. However, all his results were not noticed in Russia, and he did not gain a license for the Paralympics. Searching for financial support, he met Anton Shipulin, former biathlete and current State Duma deputy, in 2019. Shipulin found a solution to collect the needed money for the 2020 Summer Paralympics. But to qualify he should achieve good enough results to qualify for the Paralympics; this happened after he won podium places in several national and world championships and cups. Moreover, he also had the chance to take part in the triathlon competition, but the class in which he competes, PTS2, is not a sanctionized category in the Paralympics.

At the Summer Paralympics, held in Tokyo in August 2021, Astashov won gold in the 2020 individual pursuit C1 event, setting a World Record in the qualifying round and overlapping Tristen Chernove in the final. He also finished fourth in the time trial C1–3 event. However, in the road time trial event he again finished first.

References

Living people
1988 births
Paralympic gold medalists for Russia
Paralympic medalists in cycling
Medalists at the 2020 Summer Paralympics
Cyclists at the 2020 Summer Paralympics
Paratriathletes of Russia
Paralympic swimmers of Russia
Russian athletes
Paralympic gold medalists for the Russian Paralympic Committee athletes